Yevgeni Vladimirovich Kornilov (born 13 August 1985) is a former Russian professional football player.

Club career
He made his debut for FC Rostov on 31 July 2004 in a Russian Cup game against FC Sodovik Sterlitamak. He also appeared for Rostov in the next Russian Cup season on 13 July 2005 in a game against FC Luch-Energiya Vladivostok.

He played in the Russian Football National League for FC MVD Rossii Moscow and FC Chernomorets Novorossiysk in 2009.

External links
 

1985 births
Sportspeople from Taganrog
Living people
Russian footballers
Association football defenders
FC Rostov players
FC Taganrog players
FC Chernomorets Novorossiysk players
FC Neftekhimik Nizhnekamsk players
FC Chayka Peschanokopskoye players
FC MVD Rossii Moscow players